Thermo Fisher Scientific Inc. is an American supplier of scientific instrumentation, reagents and consumables, and software services. Based in Waltham, Massachusetts, Thermo Fisher was formed through the merger of Thermo Electron and Fisher Scientific in 2006. Thermo Fisher Scientific has acquired other reagent, consumable, instrumentation, and service providers, including: Life Technologies Corporation (2013), Alfa Aesar (2015), Affymetrix (2016), FEI Company (2016), BD Advanced Bioprocessing (2018), and PPD (2021).

As of 2023, the company had a market capitalization of $214 billion and was a Fortune 500 company. Annual revenue in 2021 was US$39.21 billion.

In March 2020, Thermo Fisher Scientific received emergency use authorization from the FDA for a test for SARS-CoV-2 to help mitigate the COVID-19 pandemic.

History

Predecessors and merger 
Thermo Electron was co-founded in 1956 by George N. Hatsopoulos and Peter M Nomikos. Hatsopoulos received a PhD from MIT in mechanical engineering and Nomikos was a Harvard Business School graduate.  The company focused on providing analytical and laboratory products, and had revenues of over $2 billion in 2004.

Fisher Scientific was founded in 1902 by Chester G. Fisher from Pittsburgh. It focused on providing laboratory equipment, chemicals, supplies and services used in healthcare, scientific research, safety, and education.

On May 14, 2006, Thermo Electron and Fisher Scientific announced that they would merge in a tax-free, stock-for-stock exchange; the merged company was named Thermo Fisher Scientific, and had about 30,000 employees, and reported US$9 billion in combined revenue. On November 9, 2006, the companies announced that the merger had been completed. However, the Federal Trade Commission ruled that this acquisition was anti-competitive regarding centrifugal evaporators, requiring Fisher to divest Genevac.  In April 2007, Genevac was sold to Riverlake Partners LLC and the merger closed with FTC approval.

Today, the company's products are sold under the brand names of Thermo Scientific, Fisher Scientific, and several other recognized brand names (e.g. Chromacol, Nalgene, Cellomics, Pierce Protein Research and Fermentas). According to company figures, 46% of its sales are in life sciences, 20% in healthcare, and 34% in industrial/environmental and safety.

Thermo Fisher Scientific has offices and operations worldwide, notably in the U.S. and in Europe, and China having 5,000 employees and contributing over 10% of the company's revenue.

Acquisition history 
In December 2010, Thermo Fisher Scientific announced its acquisition of Dionex for $2.1 billion.

In May 2011, Thermo Fisher Scientific Inc. bought Phadia to expand into the testing of allergies and autoimmune diseases for €2.47 billion ($3.5 billion) in cash.

In April 2013, after a competitive bidding with Hoffmann-La Roche, Thermo Fisher acquired Life Technologies Corporation for US$13.6 billion in a deal, adding further service lines related to advanced DNA sequencing and genetic testing.

In February 2015, the company announced it would acquire Advanced Scientifics for $300 million in a cash-deal. ASI designs, manufactures and delivers technologies used in bioprocessing. In June 2015, the company announced its intention to acquire Alfa Aesar, a global manufacturer of research chemicals for $405 million from Johnson Matthey, and the acquisition was completed at the end of September

In January 2016, the company announced it would acquire Affymetrix for $1.3 billion. On May 27, 2016, the company announced it would acquire FEI Company for $4.2 billion, a manufacturer of electron microscopes.  This acquisition is anticipated to close in early 2017 and will contribute to the growth of Thermo's Analytical Instruments business group. In November the company announced it would acquire MTI-GlobalStem, a previously privately held company that develops reagents for cell transfection, neurobiology and stem cell research.

In February 2017, the company acquired Finesse Solutions, Inc., developer of scalable control automation systems and software for bioproduction after receiving early termination of the waiting period under the Hart-Scott-Rodino Antitrust Improvements Act. The transaction was completed a day later. In March, the company announced it would acquire Core Informatics, provider of cloud-based platforms supporting scientific data management. In August, the company acquired Patheon, a contract development and manufacturing organization serving the pharmaceutical and biotechnology sectors, for approximately $7.2 billion. As of 2017, the company had revenues of $20.9 billion, and was a Fortune 500 company.

In September 2018, Thermo Fisher Scientific announced it had signed a definitive agreement with Becton, Dickinson and Company (BDX) to acquire their Advanced Bioprocessing business.  This BD business had annualized revenue of approximately $100 million; as of October 16, 2018, it had been integrated into Thermo Fisher's Life Sciences Solutions Segment.

In March 2019, Thermo Fisher Scientific announced its entry into the gene therapy manufacturing market with a $1.7 billion cash acquisition for Brammer Bio. In May 2019, Thermo Fisher Scientific partnered with MMJ International Holdings to manufacture drug products developed by MMJ for the treatment of multiple sclerosis and Huntington's disease. In June, the business announced it would acquire mass spectrometry software provider, HighChem.

In March 2020, Thermo Fisher Scientific agreed to purchase Qiagen, a molecular diagnostics company, for $10.1 billion. In July, the offer for Qiagen was raised from €39 to €43 per share (€11.3 billion in total).  On August 13, the company announced that its offer to acquire all of the ordinary share had lapsed, and it terminated the acquisition agreement.

In August 2020, Thermo Fisher Scientific opened its new Lenexa facility aimed at boosting the production and manufacturing of COVID-19 testing supplies. In December the business announced it would acquire Phitonex, Inc.

In January 2021, Thermo Fisher Scientific announced it had acquired Belgium-based viral vector manufacturer, Henogen SA, from Groupe Novasep SAS for €725 million in cash and Mesa Biotech, Inc. for up to $550 million.

In April 2021, Thermo Fisher Scientific announced the acquisition of PPD, Inc., a contract research organization, for a total cash purchase price of $17.4 billion-plus the assumption of approximately $3.5 billion of net debt. PPD generated $4.7 billion in revenue during FY 2020, and this transaction, which values their company at approximately $20.9 billion. In November, the business announced it would acquire PharmaFluidics and its μPAC range of micro-chip-based chromatography products.

In October 2022, the company agreed to buy British diagnostics firm, The Binding Site Group, in an all-cash deal for US$2.6billion from Nordic Capital. The acquisition completed in January 2023.

Thermo Fisher Scientific (formed in 2006 by the merger of Thermo Electron and Fisher Scientific)
Thermo Fisher Scientific
Fisher Scientific
Scientific Materials Co. (Est 1902)
Scientific Supplies, Ltd (Acq 1925)
Eimer & Amend (Acq 1940)
E. Machlett & Sons (Acq 1957)
Janssen Chimica
Eastman Kodak Company (Organic Chemicals division)
Apogent Technologies Inc. (Acq 2004)
Athena Diagnostics (Acq 2006)
Thermo Electron
Kendro Laboratory Products (Acq 2005)
Rupprecht and Patashnick Co., Inc. (Acq 2005)
NITON LLC (Acq 2005)
InnaPhase Corporation (Acq 2004)
US Counseling Services, Inc. (Acq 2004)
Jouan SA (Acq 2004)
Laboratory Management Systems, Inc. (Acq 2003)
Phadia (Acq 2011)
Life Technologies (Acq 2013)
Invitrogen Corporation (Merged 2008)
NOVEX
Research Genetics, Inc (Acq 1999)
Ethrog Biotechnology
Molecular Probes
Dynal
Panvera
InforMax
BioSource
CellzDirect
Zymed
Caltag Laboratories
Applied Biosystems (Merged 2008)
Advanced Scientifics (Acq 2015)
Alfa Aesar (Acq 2015)
Affymetrix (Acq 2016)
Genetic MicroSystems (Acq 1999)
Neomorphic (Acq 2000)
ParAllele Bioscience
USB Corporation (Acq 2008)
Panomics (Acq 2008)
True Materials (Acq 2000)
eBioscience (Acq 2012)
Compendia Bioscience (Acq 2012)
FEI Company (Acq 2016)
FEI Company (Merged 1997)
Field Electron and Ion Co. (Est 1971)
Philips Electron Optics
Micrion (Acq 1999)
MTI-GlobalStem (Acq 2016)
Finesse Solutions, Inc. (Acq 2017)
Core Informatics (Acq 2017)
Patheon (Acq 2017)
Agere Pharmaceuticals (Acq 2015)
Gallus Pharmaceuticals (Acq 2014)
Royal DSM NV (Pharmaceutical div, merged 2014)
MOVA (Acq 2004)
Banner Pharmacaps (Acq 2013)
Brammer Bio (Acq 2019)
Phitonex, Inc. (Acq 2020)
Henogen S.A. (Acq 2021)
Mesa Biotech, Inc. (Acq 2021)
PPD, Inc. (Acq 2021)
Acurian (Acq 2013)
Evidera (Acq 2016)
Medimix (Acq 2019)
PharmaFluidics (Acq 2021)
PeproTech (Acq 2021)
The Binding Site Group (Acq 2023)

Research partnership
In September 2017, Thermo Fisher Scientific signed an agreement with the Institute of Pathology Heidelberg (IPH) to establish its Center of Molecular Pathology at Heidelberg University Hospital as the newest member of the Next Generation Sequencing Companion Dx Center of Excellence Program (COEP). The initiative focuses on establishing strategic collaborations with leading, European-based organizations that can lead studies using Thermo Fisher's Oncomine portfolio of research panels destined for development as companion diagnostics to help drive precision oncology in the region.

Controversies

Xinjiang 
In February 2019, Thermo Fisher Scientific announced that it would stop selling its equipment in Xinjiang. In June 2020, Thermo Fisher Scientific was reported to sell its equipment to security services in China for use in what was alleged as part of a genetic surveillance program. A report from the Australian Strategic Policy Institute found that Thermo Fisher Scientific collaborated with the Chinese Ministry of Public Security to develop a Huaxia PCR amplification kit specifically to identify the genotypes of Uyghur, Tibetan and Hui ethnic minorities. In June 2021, The New York Times reported that, despite bans, Thermo Fisher Scientific equipment continued to be sold to police in Xinjiang.

HeLa cells 
In October 2021 the estate of Henrietta Lacks sued to get past and future payment for the alleged and widely known unauthorized sale by Thermo Fisher Scientific of her HeLa cells which are essential in many types of research. Over 50 million tons of her cells have been produced and used in over 60,000 scientific studies touching virtually every realm of medicine, including the development of polio vaccines, gene mapping, in-vitro fertilization, and multitudes more.

In May of 2022, it was announced Thermo Fisher Scientific went to court to seek a dismissal of the lawsuit.

Mexican plant 
In 2013, Opengate Capital Group LLC filed suit against Thermo Fisher Scientific for selling it a manufacturing plant controlled by a drug cartel. According to Opengate Capital, the company withheld important documents and pressured employees into concealing the presence of the gang.

Tibet 
In 2022, following reports that Thermo Fisher Scientific had sold products to police in the Tibet Autonomous Region, the Inter-Parliamentary Alliance on China called on governments to "investigate and suspend commercial activities with companies providing the PRC government with technologies to carry out biometric surveillance in the Uyghur Region, Tibet and elsewhere in the PRC, including the PRC state backed BGI Group and US firm Thermo Fisher."

References

External links 

Biotechnology companies of the United States
Life science companies based in Massachusetts
Research support companies
X-ray equipment manufacturers
Laboratory equipment manufacturers
Technology companies based in Massachusetts
Manufacturing companies based in Massachusetts
Companies based in Waltham, Massachusetts
American companies established in 2006
Manufacturing companies established in 2006
Biotechnology companies established in 2006
2006 establishments in Massachusetts
Companies listed on the New York Stock Exchange
American brands